Qashqai people (pronounced) are a tribal confederation in Iran mostly of Turkic origin. They are also believed to have incorporated Lurs, Kurds, and Arabs. Almost all of them speak a Western Turkic (Oghuz) language known as the Qashqai language, which they call "Turki", as well as Persian (the national language of Iran) in formal use. The Qashqai mainly live in the provinces of Fars, Khuzestan, Kohgiluyeh and Boyer-Ahmad, Chaharmahal and Bakhtiari, Bushehr and Southern Isfahan, especially around the cities of Shiraz and Firuzabad in Fars. The majority of Qashqai people were originally nomadic pastoralists and some remain so today. The traditional nomadic Qashqai traveled with their flocks twice yearly between the summer highland pastures north of Shiraz roughly 480 km or 300 miles south and the winter pastures on lower (and warmer) lands near the Persian Gulf, to the southwest of Shiraz. The majority, however, have now become partially or wholly sedentary. The trend towards settlement has been increasing markedly since the 1960s under government pressure, and encouragement, which has built housing for those willing to settle, starting in the early 20th century during the reign of the Pahlavi Dynasty; However, for those who continue their migratory lifestyle, the Iranian government maintains and controls travel corridors for the Qashqai and their livestock, and other populations practicing pastoral migrations. 

The Qashqai are made up of five major tribes: the Amale (Qashqai) / Amaleh (Persian), the Dere-Shorlu / Darreh-Shuri, the Kashkollu / Kashkuli, the Shishbeyli / Sheshboluki and the Eymur / Farsimadan. Smaller tribes include the Qaracha / Qarache'i, Rahimli / Rahimi and Safi-Khanli / Safi-Khani.

History 

Historically, the Turkic-speaking people are believed to have arrived in Iran from Central Asia from the 11th or 12th century onwards.

Told to Marie-Tèrése Ullens by the Ilbeg Malek Mansur, brother of the Ilkhan, Nasser Khan, Chief of the Qashqa'i, in 1953:

The Qashqai were a significant political force in Qajar Iran during the late 19th and early 20th centuries. During World War I, they were influenced by the German consular official Wilhelm Wassmuss and sided with the German Empire.  During World War II, the Qashgais attempted to organize resistance against the Anglo-Soviet invasion of Iran, receiving some ineffectual assistance from Nazi Germany in 1943 by the means of Operation ANTON, which (along with Operation FRANZ) proved a complete failure.

In 1945–1946 there was a major rebellion of a number of tribal confederacies, including the Qashgais, who fought valiantly until the invading Russians were repelled. The Qashgais revolted during 1962–1964 due to the land reforms of the White Revolution. The revolt was put down and within a few years many Qashqais had settled. Most of the tribal leaders were sent to exile.  After the Iranian Revolution of 1979, the living leader, Khosrow Khan Qashqai, returned to Iran from exile in the United States and Germany.

Major tribes

The Qashqai tribal confederation consists of five major tribes, including the Dareshuri, Farsimadan, Sheshboluki, Amaleh, and Kashkuli.

Amale / Amaleh 
People of the Amaleh tribe were originally warriors and workmen attached to the household of the Ilkhani, or paramount chief; recruited from all the Qashqai tribes they constituted the Ilkhani's bodyguard and retinue. By 1956, the Amaleh tribe comprised as many as 6,000 families.

Dere-Shorlu / Dareshuri / Darehshouri 
The Dareshuri are said to have joined the Qashqai tribal confederation during the reign of Karim Khan Zand (1163-93/1750-79). According to Persian government statistics, there were about 5,169 Dareshuri families, or 27,396 individuals, in 1360 sh./1981. The Dareshuri were "the greatest horse-breeders and owners among the Qashqai". The policy of forced sedentarization of the nomadic tribes pursued by Reza Shah Pahlavi (1304–20 SH./1925-41) resulted in the loss of 80–90 percent of the Dareshuri horses, but the tribe made a recovery after World War II. Reza Shah Pahlavi also executed Hossein khan Darehshouri the head of Darehshouri family in order to take back the control of the Fars province which was controlled by Darehshouri tribe during Ghajar empire.

Kashkollu / Kashkuli 
During World War I, the Kashkuli khans supported the British in their struggle against Ṣowlat-al-Dowla (Iyl-khan) and the German agent, Wilhelm Wassmuss. After the war, Ṣowlat-al-Dowla punished the Kashkuli. He dismissed the Kashkuli leaders who had opposed him and "deliberately set out to break up and impoverish the Kashkuli tribe". Two sections of the tribe, which consisted of elements which had been loyal to Ṣowlat-al-Dowla, were then separated from the main body of the tribe and given the status of independent tribes, becoming the Kashkuli Kuchak ("Little Kashkuli") and Qarachahi tribes. The remaining tribe became known as the Kashkuli Bozorg ("Big Kashkuli") tribe. The Kashkuli Bozorg tribe comprised 4,862 households in 1963. As Oliver Garrod observed, the Kashkuli Bozorg are "especially noted for their Jajims, or tartan woolen blankets, and for the fine quality of their rugs and trappings".

Eymur / Farsimadan 
The Farsimadan claim that they are of Ḵhalaj origin, and that, before moving to southern Persia, they dwelled in Ḵalajestan, a region southwest of Tehran. The tribe was already in Fars by the late 16th century, for it is known that in October 1590 their leader, Abul-Qasem Beyg and some of his followers were punished for having sided with Yaqub Khan the Zul-Qadr governor of Fars, in a revolt against Shah Abbas I. The population of the Farsimadan was estimated by Afshaar-Sistaani at 2,715 families or 12,394 individuals, in 1982.

Culture 

The Qashqai are pastoral nomads who rely on small-scale cultivation and shepherding. Traditional dress includes the use of decorated short tunics, wide-legged pants, and headscarves worn by women.

Carpeting and weaving 
The Qashqai are renowned for their pile carpets and other woven wool products. They are sometimes referred to as "Shiraz" because Shiraz was the major marketplace for them in the past. The wool produced in the mountains and valleys near Shiraz is exceptionally soft and beautiful and takes a deeper color than wool from other parts of Iran.

"No wool in all Persia takes such a rich and deep colour as the Shiraz wool. The deep blue and the dark ruby red are equally extraordinary, and that is due to the brilliancy of the wool, which is firmer and, so to say, more transparent than silk, and makes one think of translucent enamel".

Qashqai carpets have been said to be "probably the most famous of all Persian tribal weavings". Qashqai saddlebags, adorned with colorful geometric designs, "are superior to any others made".

Notable individuals 

 One of the famous Qashqai tribes, Ismail Khan Qashqai is known as Solat al-Dawla, the leader of the nomads (born 1257 AH / 1295 AH). The history of his struggles during the constitutional period as well as in the role he played in the Persian campaign of World War I is very significant. He is one of the famous Qashqai patriarchs who has played an important role in the history of the Qashqai tribe as well as in the political events of the country. Solat al-Dawla died in Qasr Prison in Tehran on October 6, 1931. [69]

 Another figure named Jahangir Khan Qashqaei is from the Darhshouri tribe (born 1206 AH / 1243 AH) who migrated with the tribe until he was 40 years old and had a primary school education. During a trip to Isfahan to repair his room, he encounters a person who advises him to pursue science. His prominent students include Mohammad Ali Shahabadi, Seyyed Hossein Tabatabai Boroujerdi, Seyyed Hassan Modarres, Nokhodaki Esfahani and others. He died in 1289 AH (1328 AH) and was buried in "Isfahan Steel Throne". [70]

 Haj Ayazkhan Qashqaei, the author of the travelogue of Hajj and Atbat-e-Aliat during the reign of Ahmad Shah Qajar (author of the first Qashqaei travelogue) is another Qashqai famous. He is considered to be the advisor and trustee of Ismail Khan Solat al-Dawla Qashqai and one of the famous Qashqai during the First World War. He was born in 1287 AH (1248 AH) and died in 1979 AH (1318 AH). [71]

 Mohammad Ibrahim, nicknamed Mazun Qashqaei, is a famous Qashqai poet from the Qaderlu Borbur tribe of the Amla tribe. He was born in 1246 AH and died in 1313 AH. Mazoon has mystical and romantic poems in Persian and Qashqai languages ​​and Shahbaz Shahbazi (collector of Qashqai poets) considers him the greatest Qashqai poet. [72]

 Mohammad Bahmanbeigi (26 Bahman 1298 - 11 May 1389) was a great writer of the Qashqai tribe and the founder of nomadic education in Iran.

Cultural references 
 In 2006, Nissan named its new European small SUV "Qashqai", after the Qashqai people. The designers believe that the buyers "will be nomadic in nature too".

See also 
 Qashqai Football Club
 Iranian Turks
 Bichaghchi (tribe)
 Yörüks

Footnotes

Notes

References 
 Beck, Lois. 1986. The Qashqa'i of Iran. New Haven: Yale University Press. 
Dolatkhah, Sohrab. 2016. Kashkai : langue turcique d'Iran. Published independently (via KDP Amazon).
 Hawley, Walter A. 1913. Oriental Rugs: Antique and Modern. Reprint: Dover Publications, New York. 1970. .
 Kiani, M. 1999. Departing for the Anemone: Art in The Qashqai Tribal Confederation. Kian-Nashr Publications, Shiraz. .(This beautiful book has hundreds of photos, both black and white and colored, illustrating the daily life of the Qashqai people, their rugs and weaving. The text is in Persian but the color photos also have English captions).
 O'Sullivan, Adrian. 2014. Nazi Secret Warfare in Occupied Persia (Iran): The Failure of the German Intelligence Services, 1939–45. Basingstoke: Palgrave Macmillan. .
 Ullens de Schooten, Marie-Tèrése. (1956). Lords of the Mountains: Southern Persia & the Kashkai Tribe. Chatto and Windus Ltd. Reprint: The Travel Book Club. London.
 Ure, John. (2003). In Search of Nomads: An English Obsession from Hester Stanhope to Bruce Chatwin, pp. 51–71. John Ure. Robinson. London.

Further reading 
 Beck, Lois. 1991. Nomad: A Year in the Life of a Qashqa'i Tribesman in Iran. University of California. Berkeley, Los Angeles.  (hbk);  (pbk).
 Dolatkhah, Sohrab. 2019. Qashqai Turkic: a Comprehensive Corpus-based Grammar. Munich: LINCOM.
Dolatkhah, Sohrab. 2016. Parlons Qashqay. Paris: L'Harmattan.
 Dolatkhah, Sohrab. 2015. Qashqay Folktales. CreateSpace Independent Publishing Platform.
 Oberling, Pierre. 
 Shahbazi, Mohammad. 2001. "The Qashqa'i Nomads of Iran (Part I): Formal Education." Nomadic Peoples NS (2001) Vol. 5. Issue 1, pp. 37–64.
 Shahbazi, Mohammad. 2002. "The Qashqa'i Nomads of Iran (Part II): State-supported Literacy and Ethnic Identity." Nomadic Peoples NS (2002) Vol. 6. Issue 1, pp. 95–123.

External links 

 Qashqai at the Encyclopedia Iranica

 
Ethnic groups in Iran
Pastoralists
Fars Province
Khuzestan Province
Isfahan Province